Ust-Saldybash (Saldıbaştamaq) is a rural locality (a village) in Krasnogorsky Selsoviet, Nurimanovsky District, Bashkortostan, Russia. The population was 35 as of 2010. There are 2 streets.

Geography 
Ust-Saldybash is located 16 km southwest of Krasnaya Gorka (the district's administrative centre) by road. Starobedeyevo is the nearest rural locality.

References 

Rural localities in Nurimanovsky District